Baldwin, formerly known as Agassiz and also called Harvard North, Area 8 or Agassiz/Baldwin, is an unincorporated section of the city of Cambridge, Massachusetts, United States and as one of the thirteen sections (neighborhoods) that make up the City of Cambridge. Bounded by Massachusetts Avenue on the west, Cambridge Street, Quincy Street, and Kirkland Street on the south, Porter Square on the north, and the Somerville border on the northeast. It contains the Maria L. Baldwin Elementary School, known as the Agassiz School until 2002.

The neighborhood was formerly named for Louis Agassiz (1807-1873), a Harvard biologist and geologist. After being informally known as Agassiz/Baldwin for several years, in 2021 the neighborhood was renamed for Maria Louise Baldwin  (1856-1922), an African American educator who, as principal of the former Agassiz School, was the first Black woman principal in New England. Like many places and buildings formerly named for Agassiz, this change came following controversy over his scientific racist beliefs, including polygenism and eugenics. The change was first proposed in City Council by Cambridge high school student Maya Counter in 2020.

It is the home to campuses of Lesley University and the Harvard University Law School. In 2005 it had a population of 5,241 residents living in 1,891 households, and the average household income was $55,380. The Baldwin neighborhood has two zip codes 02138 and 02140, which also serve the villages of West and North Cambridge, respectively.

Notes

References
Cambridge Police Department

Neighborhoods in Cambridge, Massachusetts